Unai Basurko is a Spanish professional sailor born on 2 April 1973 in Portugalete which is on the Biscay.

He is a participant of the 2008-2009 Vendée Globe retired during the first part of the race going down the Atlantic Ocean due to a broken rudder.

Biography

Results

2009 
 Pakea Bizkaia The Solitaire du Figaro.
1997:
 1st of the Commodores Cup
1998:
 1st plymouth Regatte-San Sebascion
 1st of the Trans-Tasman Race
 Tour of Spain sailing
1999:
 2nd World IMS Championships
2003:
 Solitaire du Figaro
2004:
 Bilbar record (Bilbao-Barcelona)
2007:
 15th in the Transat Jacques-Vabre in the IMOCA category on Pakea Bizkaia 2003 with Gonzalo Gandarias
 3rd of the Velux 5 Oceans Race onboard IMOCA 60 - Pakea-Bizkaia 
2008
 RET 2008-2009 Vendée Globe onboard IMOCA 60 - Pakea-Bizkaia

References

1973 births
Living people
People from Portugalete
Spanish male sailors (sport)
Sportspeople from Biscay
IMOCA 60 class sailors
Spanish Vendee Globe sailors
2008 Vendee Globe sailors
Single-handed circumnavigating sailors
Sailors (sport) from the Basque Country (autonomous community)